Order to cash (OTC or O2C) normally refers to one of the top-level (context level) business processes for receiving and processing customer orders and revenue recognition. Order to cash is an essential function in finance; the entire cycle of events happens after a customer places an order until the customer pays for the order; that is, the order is converted to cash. Other top-level business processes include "Marketing to Lead", "Opportunity to Order", "Procure-to-Pay" (P2P), "Issue to Complete" (for manufacturing production) "Hire to Retire", "Concept to Launch" (for innovation and new product development), "Sustain and Retain" (for customer service and support) and "Record to Report" for general ledger processes. Recently, the concept of order-to-cash has been extended to "Lead to Cash" by many software providers to include also the marketing and pre-sales process steps.

The context level processes are utilized in a number of ways by businesses such as business process reengineering, aligning enterprise architectures and IT solutions as well as "blueprinting" as part of Enterprise Resource Planning (ERP) systems.

In many business models, a contractual relationship is established first via a Contract or Subscription. Orders are then received via different sales channels, such as phone, fax, email, internet or salesperson. The contractual relationship is confirmed, and the orders are fulfilled through shipping and logistics. On completion of key events, an invoice is generated and booked as Sales (subject to "Revenue Recognition" requirements). If payment has not already been received, the debt is recorded and pursued through dunning cycles until the funds are received. Order to Cash is completed by the Customer Care and Field Service and Repair process (inquiries, requests and complaints).

Order to cash in ERP software 
All ERP systems provide order to cash processes. Examples are Microsoft Dynamics 365, Oracle Cloud ERP, Oracle NetSuite, SAP ERP SD, SAP Business ByDesign or Workday. Typical sub-processes and variants in those ERP systems are:

 Customer master data entry
Lead management, opportunity management and quotation management
 Order and contract entry (creation, availability check and booking)
Order fulfillment (physical and digital fulfillment)
 Distribution
 Invoicing
 Customer payments / collection
 Cash application
 Deductions (if invoice short paid by customer)
 Collections

Difference between quote to cash and order to cash 
Quote to Cash (Q2C) refers to all the business processes involved in O2C, customer purchase intent, configuration pricing quoting, and contract lifecycle management.

See also 

Customer relationship management
 List of embedded CRM systems

References

Enterprise resource planning terminology
Supply chain management
Customer relationship management